The  is a private railway in Japan which connects Kamakura Station in Kamakura with Fujisawa Station in Fujisawa, Kanagawa. Stations en route include , the stop closest to Kōtoku-in, the temple with the colossal outdoor statue of Amida Buddha. The railway is fully owned by the Odakyu Group of companies.

Route and operations

It is single-track; however, five of the route's fifteen stations are equipped with passing loops, allowing for the operation of bi-directional traffic. Trains are electrically powered from 600 V DC overhead lines. The section from Kamakura Station to Koshigoe is in the city of Kamakura; that from Enoshima to Fujisawa Station is in the city of Fujisawa.

Stations

Rolling stock
, Enoden operates a fleet of 15 two-car electric multiple unit (EMU) train types as shown below.

Former rolling stock

 500 series

Buses

Enoden also operates bus service in the area.

History
The original Enoshima Electric Railway opened the line on 1 September 1902.

The company subsequently went through a series of ownership changes: Yokohama Electric Railway Co. in 1911, Tokyo Electric Power Co. in 1921, (second) Enoshima Electric Railway Co. in 1926, Tokyu Corporation in 1938, Enoshima Kamakura Tourist Co. in 1949, and Odakyu Electric Railway Co. in 1953. The (third) Enoshima Electric Railway Co. was formed on 1 September 1981 as a subsidiary of Odakyu.

Popular culture
Gokurakuji Station is one of the settings for the 2015 film Our Little Sister.

Japanese alternative rock band Asian Kung-Fu Generation's fifth studio album, Surf Bungaku Kamakura (released 2008), had each track named after a stop on the railway line starting with Fujisawa and ending with Kamakura. The band has since announced a continuation of this album for the rest of the stations that did not originally have a song, starting withYanagikōji Parallel Universe releasing as a B-side track in 2022.

Anime 
The Enoshima Electric Railway and its rolling stock painted in the company's green-and-yellow colours have made numerous appearances in Japanese animated series, including those adapted from manga and light novel series such as:
 Slam Dunk (1993)
 Sweet Blue Flowers (2009)
 A Channel (2011)
 Tsuritama (2012)
 Tari Tari (2012)
 Ping Pong: the Animation (2014)
 Hanayamata (2014)
 Myriad Colors Phantom World (2016)
 Minami Kamakura High School Girls Cycling Club (2017)
 Rascal Does Not Dream of Bunny Girl Senpai (2018)
 Super Cub (2021)

Video games 
 Enoden's railway line was entirely simulated in a train simulator Densha de Go! Ryojōhen.

References
This article incorporates material from the corresponding article in the Japanese Wikipedia.

Further reading

External links

 

 
1067 mm gauge railways in Japan
Japanese companies established in 1900
Companies based in Kanagawa Prefecture
Railway companies established in 1900
Rail transport in Kanagawa Prefecture
Tram transport in Japan
600 V DC railway electrification